The London lobsters, Haselrig's Lobsters or just "Lobsters" were the name given to the cavalry unit raised and led by Sir Arthur Haselrig, a Parliamentarian who fought in the English Civil War. The unit derived its name from the regiment being one of very few units raised as cuirassiers, equipped in suits of plate armour reaching from the head to the knee. The regiment had a somewhat chequered career in combat, but was credited with being one of very few Parliamentarian cavalry units able to stand up to the mounted charge of the Cavaliers in the early years of the war.

Background

Haselrig was a prominent leader of Parliament's opposition to King Charles, and when the quarrel broke into open warfare he formed this unit, outfitting it with his own money. The unit received its name because, unusually for the time, they were cuirassiers, wearing extensive armour that covered most of their body (except for the lower legs) making them appear somewhat like lobsters. Only two cuirassier  regiments were raised during the English Civil War, the other being the Lifeguard of the Earl of Essex, however, individual cavalrymen within other regiments also served in complete armour. Full armour had largely been abandoned at this time, with cuirasses and helmets only worn by some cavalry (harquebusiers), commanders and pike units. The armour of a cuirassier was very expensive; in England, in 1629, a cuirassier's equipment cost four pounds and 10 shillings, whilst a harquebusier's (a lighter type of cavalry) was a mere one pound and six shillings.

War service

The "lobsters" were probably the last unit to fight on English soil wearing full armour,  and one of the last in Europe. They were credited with being "the first that made any impression upon the King's horse  [the Royalist cavalry], who being unarmed [unarmoured], were not able to bear the shock with them; besides they were secure from hurts of the sword..."

Haselrig's regiment formed the heavy cavalry in the army of Sir William Waller. On 13 April 1643 at Ripple Field they suffered 70% casualties covering the Parliamentarian retreat. But the "lobsters" then distinguished themselves at Lansdown on 5 July.  However, at the Battle of Roundway Down, on 13 July, they met a Royalist cavalry charge at the halt, using the 'Dutch' tactic of receiving a charge by firing while stationary. After a brief clash they retreated in disorder, the Parliamentarian army losing the battle. Though they were defeated, the armour they wore apparently served them well; Haselrig was shot three times at Roundway Down, with the bullets bouncing off his armour. After firing a pistol at Haselrig's helmeted head at close range, without any effect, Richard Atkyns described how he attacked him with his sword, but it too caused no visible damage. Haselrig was under attack from a number of people and only succumbed when Atkyns attacked his unarmoured horse. After the death of his horse Haselrig tried to surrender; but as he fumbled with his sword, which was tied to his wrist, he was rescued. He suffered only minor wounds from his ordeal.

This incident was related to Charles I and elicited  one of his rare attempts at humour. The King said that if Haselrig had been as well supplied as he was fortified he could have withstood a siege.

At the Battle of Cheriton on 29 March 1644 the unit attacked a royalist regiment of infantry under Sir Henry Bard. Bard's unit had advanced towards the Parliamentary cavalry, but had moved too fast and were no longer in formation with the rest of the Royalist infantry. The Lobsters saw this and Haselrig led 300 of them against Bard's regiment. The royalist regiment was completely destroyed, with all the infantry either killed or taken prisoner. Parliament eventually won the battle.

Standard

The standard, or flag, carried by the regiment is described as an anchor descending from the clouds on a green field, with the motto 'Only in Heaven'.

Legacy

Haselrig's regiment was the lineal predecessor of the Royal Horse Guards,  today one of the household regiments of the British monarchy.

"Sir William Waller having received from London [in June 1643] a fresh regiment of five hundred horse, under the command of sir Arthur Haslerigge, which were so prodigiously armed that they were called by the other side the regiment of lobsters, because of their bright iron shells with which they were covered, being perfect curasseers."

Notes

References 
 Denton, Barry, Only in Heaven: The Life and Campaigns of Sir Arthur Hesilrige, 1601-1661, Bloomsbury, 1997. .
 Haythornthwaite, Philip (1983) The English Civil War, An Illustrated History Blandford Press. .
 Clarendon, Edward Earl of, The history of the rebellion and civil wars in England, 1647 (reprinted 1839).

External links 
 Arthur Haselrig
 - An account of the battle (1) 
 http://www.english-heritage.org.uk/upload/pdf/Lansdown.pdf 

1644 in England
Military units and formations of the English Civil War
Cavalry units and formations of the United Kingdom
Household Cavalry